Lilian Serpas Gutiérrez (1905–1985) was a Salvadoran poet. It has been said "information on her is scarce and contradictory", but that she may have had a sexual relationship with Che Guevara. She appeared on a postage stamp of El Salvador and is in the novel Amulet.

References 

1905 births
1985 deaths
Salvadoran poets
20th-century poets
Salvadoran women poets
20th-century women writers